The UNC Greensboro Spartans men's basketball team represents the University of North Carolina at Greensboro in NCAA Division I. The school's team currently competes in the Southern Conference.

History
The school, formerly The Women's College of The University of North Carolina, allowed male students beginning 1965-66 and started a men's basketball program the following year. The first coach was an instructor in the Physical Education program, the assistant was an administrator in the Chancellor's office, with some limited experience from the University of Kansas basketball program. Games were scheduled with Belmont Abbey, Elon, Guilford, and a few other small colleges. Players came from already-enrolled students, responding to on-campus ads. No records of results are available. UNC Greensboro formalized their program and entered into a twenty-year period participating  as an NCAA Division III member, before moving up to NCAA Division II in 1988, and swiftly ascending to NCAA Division I by 1991.

1991-1999: Division I Firsts for the Spartans
Mike Dement served as the architect of the program in its move to Division I. He was the Spartans' head coach from 1991 to 1995, leading them from a team with no conference affiliation to the top of the Big South Conference regular season standings in just four seasons. In his last two seasons at UNCG, Dement's teams went 38–18, including a then school-record 23 wins in 1994–95, along with the Big South Conference's regular season title. That team received votes in the Associated Press and ESPN/USA Today Coaches' polls, a first for the program.

Following the 1994-95 season, Dement left to take over the men's basketball program at SMU and was replaced in Greensboro by Randy Peele. In only the second season in which UNC Greensboro was eligible for Division I postseason competition, the Spartans won the Big South Conference regular season and tournament championship, advancing to the NCAA tournament where they received the 15th seed in the Southeast region. In their first NCAA appearance, they fell in the first round to the Cincinnati Bearcats.

After following up their conference championship season with a 10–20 regular season, however, UNC Greensboro left the Big South in 1997 to join the Southern Conference.  The Spartans finished at or near the bottom of their division in both of their first two seasons in the SoCon and, after four years in Greensboro, Peele left the Spartans and took an assistant's job with the Virginia Tech Hokies.

1999-2005: Fran McCaffery Brings the Spartans Back
Fran McCaffery hit the ground running in Greensboro, compiling a 15–13 record overall and a 9–7 Southern Conference mark in his first season that was the 18th-most improved record nationally among NCAA Division I teams.

In his second season, he guided the Spartans to a 19–12 record and the 2001 SoCon tournament championship. It was the school's second NCAA tournament berth. They received a 16 seed, losing in the first round to overall tournament top seed Stanford.

The following year (2001–2002) McCaffery led the Spartans to their first 20-win season since joining the Southern Conference. It marked the first time the program claimed a share of the SoCon North Division title as well. After falling to eventual tournament champion Davidson in the conference tournament semifinals, the Spartans were awarded a berth into the 2002 NIT, where they lost to eventual champion Memphis.

In his final year in Greensboro, McCaffery brought the Spartans to the brink of the NCAA Tournament before a SoCon Championship game loss to Chattanooga. He led UNCG to a victory over Davidson in the semifinals, defeating a team that had been 16–0 in conference play. A big part of that success was SoCon Freshman of the Year Kyle Hines. Hines set UNC Greensboro and SoCon records for blocked shots, and also broke several other UNC Greensboro single-game and freshman single-season marks. After the season, McCaffery left UNC Greensboro to take the head men's basketball position at Siena

2005-2011: Return of Mike Dement
In his first season back at UNC Greensboro, Mike Dement led a young Spartan squad to a 12–19 mark. He had two players earn all-conference status in Ricky Hickman and Kyle Hines, and another earn SoCon All-Freshman honors.

In 2006–07, Dement guided the Spartans to a 16–14 mark, including a second-place finish in the Southern Conference's Northern Division. Hines, only a junior, earned Southern Conference Player of the Year and Associated Press All-America Honorable Mention status – both accomplishments were firsts for the UNC Greensboro program. The Spartans were considered by many to be the most dangerous team in that year's SoCon Tournament, but were upended in the final seconds by Furman in the quarterfinal round.

Despite milestones like the program's first-ever win over an ACC team (Georgia Tech in 2007), and the largest ever home crowd at a UNC Greensboro basketball game (21,124 vs Duke in 2005), Dement's teams saw little success in his return. After several seasons with fewer than 10 victories, Dement eventually resigned in the middle of the 2011-12 season.

Move to Greensboro Coliseum
Beginning with the 2009–10 season, the men's basketball team plays all of their home games in the Greensboro Coliseum. The arena, which holds over 23,000 seats, is configured to hold around 7,500 spectators for most games.

As part of the move, the Coliseum remodeled a floor to become a Spartan home floor and also completely renovated a massive locker room space for the team, complete with training room, meeting facilities, coaches offices and a players' lounge.

2011-2021: Sustained Success Under Wes Miller
Following the mid-season resignation of Mike Dement in December 2011, Wes Miller was given the reins of the program on an interim basis. At the time, the Spartans had a record of 2-8 and were in the midst of an eleven-game losing streak. Under Miller, the team finished Southern Conference play with a 10-8 record, 13-19 overall, winning first place in the Southern Conference North Division. Miller was named the 2012 Southern Conference Coach of the Year and was hired officially as head coach.

The Spartans struggled in Miller's first few years, but he soon brought UNC Greensboro an unprecedented run of success. The Spartans reached 25 wins for three successive seasons between 2016 and 2019, won three Southern Conference championships, reached the NCAA tournament in 2018 and 2021, and recorded the program's first postseason victory in the 2019 NIT. Miller is currently the winningest coach in the program's history.

Players recruited by Wes Miller regularly set new Spartan records. Guard Francis Alonso became UNC Greensboro's all-time leader in made 3-pointers  and was a two-time first-team All-SoCon selection (2018, 2019). The Spartans also boasted four consecutive Southern Conference Defensive Players of the Year in forward  James L. Dickey III (2018) and guard Isaiah Miller (2019, 2020, 2021). Isaiah Miller would go on to become the most decorated player in program history, being named Southern Conference Player of the Year in both 2020 and 2021, the first player to earn back to back SoCon Player of the Year awards since Stephen Curry at Davidson.

The 2018–2019 Spartans enjoyed what was arguably their most successful season under Wes Miller. The team went 29–7, finishing 2nd in the Southern Conference and receiving the #1 overall seed in the NIT tournament where they beat Campbell in the First Round before losing to eventual tournament runners-up Lipscomb.

On April 14, 2021, Miller left UNC Greensboro to become the head men's basketball coach at the University of Cincinnati.

2021-Present: After Wes Miller

On April 19, 2021, UNC Greensboro hired Mike Jones as head men's basketball coach.

Retired numbers

The Spartans have retired three jersey numbers.

Scott Hartzell #5
Hartzell was inducted into the UNCG Athletics Hall of Fame in 2006. He led UNCG in three-point field goals, three-point shooting percentage, and free throw shooting percentage all four seasons he played. He graduated in 1996 as the school's all-time leader in points at 1,539 and assists at 552. Though those marks have since been eclipsed, he still holds the UNCG records for career three-point field goal percentage (43.9%).

In 1995–96, Hartzell led the Spartans to their first NCAA men's basketball tournament appearance after winning the 1996 Big South Championship. During that memorable run, Hartzell ran his streak of consecutive games with a three-point field goal to 42 straight.

Courtney Eldridge #23
Eldridge led the Spartans to the 2001 Southern Conference tournament championship against University of Tennessee at Chattanooga and their second NCAA tournament appearance. 
During the 2001–2002 season, he was ranked 9th in the Nation and 1st in the SoCon in steals, 23rd in the nation and 3rd in the conference in assists., leading that team to the 2002 Southern Conference regular season title and earning a bid to the NIT.

Eldridge is the Spartan's all-time career leader in assists (584).

Kyle Hines #42
In the 2006–07 season, Kyle Hines became the first player in UNCG history to receive the Southern Conference Player of the Year honor and to be named to the Associated Press All-America Honorable Mention. He became only the sixth player to score 2,000 points, grab 1,000 rebounds and block 300 shots in his college career, joining the ranks of David Robinson, Alonzo Mourning, Tim Duncan, Pervis Ellison and Derrick Coleman.

Hines is the Spartan's all-time leader in a number of statistical categories, including points (2187), blocks (349), points per game (18.2), and rebounds per game (8.7).

Season-by-season results

Postseason

NCAA Division I Tournament results
The Spartans have appeared in the NCAA Division I tournament four times. Their combined record is 0–4.

NIT results
The Spartans have appeared in the National Invitation Tournament (NIT) three times. Their combined record is 1–3.

CBI results
The Spartans have appeared in the College Basketball Invitational (CBI) twice. Their record is 1–2.

Current coaching staff

Notable former players

References

External links